Skorpo is an uninhabited island in Bjørnafjorden Municipality in Vestland county, Norway. The island lies just off the mainland west of Hagavik. The island of Strøno lies just southeast of Skorpo.

The only access to the island is by private boats.  There are no permanent residents on the island, but there are a number of homes on the island that are used as holiday/vacation homes.

See also
List of islands of Norway

References

Islands of Vestland
Bjørnafjorden
Uninhabited islands of Norway